Abdulbaki Nasir Dede was a Turkish composer. By the request of Selim III, Abdülbâki authored the treatise “Tetkik ve Tahkik” (“Examination and Verification”), and transcribed and published the compositions of the sultan. Among Abdülbâki Dede’s most notable works are his ayins in the Acembuselik, Isfahân and Şevkitarap maqams as well as his translation of “Menakıbı Arif” and “Şerhi Şahidi”. He died in 1820 and was buried next to the Yenikapı Mevlevihane of which he had been the sheikh and neyzenbaşı (chief ney performer).

See also 
 List of composers of classical Turkish music

References

Composers of Ottoman classical music
Composers of Turkish makam music
1765 births
1820 deaths